Akte Grüninger is a Swiss-Austrian feature film produced in 2013 for the Swiss television SRF. The television film focuses on events in late summer 1938, when Paul Grüninger saved the lives of up to 3,600 Jewish refugees from Germany and Austria by pre-dating their visas, enabling them to migrate 'illegally' to Switzerland.

Plot 
In August 1938, Switzerland closed its borders to Jewish refugees who tried to evade the Nazi regime. Migration of Jewish people across the green border to Switzerland was declared by the Swiss government to be illegal, and refugees were sent back to Germany and Austria. Hundreds of people without a valid visa tried to cross the border to be secure in Switzerland from the Holocaust, most of them by crossing the border to the Canton of St. Gallen. These "illegal migrations" and the background of the border crossings, and its support by officials and citizens in Switzerland, got the attention of the Swiss immigration police.

Swiss immigration police senior official Heinrich Rothmund (Robert Hunger-Bühler) ordered the police inspector Robert Frei (Max Simonischek), a ruthless, loyal, and authoritarian official, to investigate in the canton of St. Gallen. The Jewish refugees appeared to be supported by parts of the local population, with approval of the police commandant of the Canton St. Gallen, Paul Grüninger (Stefan Kurt). Frei's investigation confirmed the suspicion that police captain Grüninger allowed Jewish refugees to enter without a valid visa. Grüninger also falsified documents and personally helped refugees to illegally cross the border into Switzerland. Grüninger confesses to Frei, but he says he is not acting against the law or against the state security of Switzerland. His motives are based on pure humanity. Frei is overawed by Grüninger's integrity, intransigence and his personal views, and Frei comes to doubt the legality of the investigations.

Cast 
In alphabetical order
 Helmut Förnbacher as Valentin Keel
 Aaron Hitz as Ernst Kamm 
 Robert Hunger-Bühler as Heinrich Rothmund 
 Peter Jecklin as Walter Härtsch 
 Julia Jelinek as Jewish woman 
 Martin Klaus as Anton Schneider 
 Stefan Kurt as Paul Grüninger 
 Ursina Lardi as Alice Grünigner 
 Beat Marti as Alfons Eigenmann 
 Patrick Rapold as Ernest Prodollier 
 Monicy Reyes as Ida Kreutner 
 Maximilian Simonischek as Robert Frei 
 Anatole Taubman as Sidney Dreifuss

Background 

While the events in August 1938 and thereafter and most of the characters are based on facts and on historical personalities, the role of inspector Frei is fictitious. Paul Grüninger was dismissed by the government without notice in March 1939. Two years later, Grüninger was sentenced by the district court of St. Gallen because of official misconduct and forgery to a fine: he was demoted, dismissed from the police service, sentenced to a fine, and received no pension. In 1995 the district court of St. Gallen revoked the judgment against Paul Grüninger, and in 1998 the government of the Canton of St. Gallen paid compensation to his descendants. Ostracized and accused and slandered as a womanizer and corrupt fraudsters, even as a Nazi by some people in the 2000s, the former chief of police for the rest of his life was no longer fixed point: Paul Grüninger died in 1972, nearly forgotten in Switzerland, without rehabilitation by the Swiss authorities, though in 1971, the Yad Vashem Holocaust memorial foundation in Israel had honoured Grüninger as one of the Righteous Among the Nations.

Already brought back partially into the public memory by some publications beginning in 1984, in 1999 also the so-called Bergier Commission's report took part in Grüninger's rehabilitation, as well in rehabilitating the surviving people who had been convicted during the Nazi period in Switzerland for their assistance to refugees – 137 women and men got public rehabilitation in 2009. The Rhine bridge between Diepoldsau (Switzerland) and Hohenems in Austria, which was one of the locations in the film, was in the summer of 2012 named after Paul Grüninger.

Production 
Akte Grüninger was produced by the Swiss television broadcaster SRF, and supported by the arte network and by the Fernsehfonds Austria foundation. The film's plot is complemented by historic cuts. Shooting took place in the canton of St. Gallen and in Austria in late 2012 and early 2013 over 11 weeks, in locations including Mels, Diepoldsau and Hohenems, at the original locations by C-Films, Mecom Fiction GmbH and makido film; post production ended in mid-2013. Production of the film was also supported by the Swiss and Austrian authorities and some organizations, among them the Bundeamt für Kultur (EDI), Zürcher Filmstiftung, city of St. Gallen, Canton of St. Gallen, Swisslos, Vorarlberg Kultur, Landys & Gyr foundation, and Schweizerischer Israelitischer Gemeindebund (SIG).

Cinema and television 
The film was broadcast on Arte in December 2013. On Swiss television, Akte Grüninger was shown for the last time on 19 October 2014 at 08:05 pm on SRF 1. It premiered on 23 January 2014 at the Solothurn Film Festival in Switzerland and on 29 January 2014 in Austria; the film was also shown in selected Swiss and Austrian cinemas beginning on 30 January 2014.

Critical response 
Neue Zürcher Zeitung claims "the film is daring in its production of Swiss history, with the neuralgic issues that it raises in quite delicate and relevant points - more than most recent movies produced in Switzerland". The film was reviewed by the teacher's association in December 2013 for educational use in Swiss schools, and recommended for general educational purposes in Austria.

Awards 
 2014: Opening film of the Solothurn Film Festival
 2014: Swiss Film Award, nomination for Stefan Kurt as best actor

Home media 
The film was released in 2014 on Blu-ray and DVD in German language.

See also 
 Grüningers Fall, a Swiss documentary film (1997)
 Das Boot ist voll, a Swiss film (1981)
 History of the Jews in Switzerland

References

External links
  
 

2013 television films
2013 films
Swiss television films
2010s German-language films
2013 drama films
Films shot in Switzerland
Films shot in Austria
Holocaust films
German-language television shows
Swiss German-language films